Kolehmainen is a Finnish surname. Notable people with the surname include:

 David Kolehmainen (1885–1918), Finnish wrestler
 Eero Kolehmainen (born 1918), former Finnish cross country skier
 Hannes Kolehmainen (1889–1966), Finnish four-time Olympic Gold medalist and a world record holder in middle- and long-distance running.
 Janne Kolehmainen (born 1986), Finnish ice hockey player
 Kristiina Kolehmainen (1956–2012), Finnish-Swedish librarian
 Mikko Kolehmainen (born 1964), retired Finnish flatwater canoer
 Olli Kolehmainen (born 1967), Finnish canoer
 Seppo Kolehmainen (born 1933), Finnish film actor
 Tatu Kolehmainen (1885–1967), Finnish long-distance runner
 Toni Kolehmainen (born 1988), Finnish professional football midfielder
 William Kolehmainen (1887–1967), Finnish-American long-distance runner

Finnish-language surnames